Abdul Aziz bin Abdullah bin Laboun (Arabic: عبدالعزيز بن لعبون) is a Saudi geologist, traveler, and historian specializing in petroleum geology. His interest in geology and oil history in Saudi Arabia extended to other fields including history and popular literature. He has published many books, the most prominent of which is the book (The Journey of Oil Exploration and Industry in the Kingdom of Saudi Arabia) and the Book (Najdi Historians and Their Effects)

Education 
He holds a professorship (professor) in the field of geological and oil studies from King Saud University in 2012.

He holds a PhD in Petroleum Geology from King Abdulaziz University in 1982.

He holds a master's degree in geology from the University of Tulsa, Oklahoma, USA, in 1977.

He holds a university degree in geology - chemistry from the University of Riyadh (now King Saud University) in 1973.

works 

 He worked in the Air Survey Department at the Ministry of Petroleum and Mineral Resources from 1967 to 1969.
 He worked at the Arabian Oil Company Ltd. in Khafji from 1973 to 1980.
 He worked for Saudi Aramco from 1980 to 1999.
 He worked as a professor of geology at King Saud University.

Publication 

 (The march of discovery and the oil industry in the Kingdom of Saudi Arabia).
 (The illustrated documentary record of the oil industry in the Kingdom of Saudi Arabia).
 (Agreements of oil and minerals in the Kingdom of Saudi Arabia).
 (The oil industry during the era of the Custodian of the Two Holy Mosques King Fahd bin Abdulaziz Al Saud).
 (The fall of the book, the story of the discovery of oil in the Kingdom of Saudi Arabia).
 (Ais and earthquakes).
 (Dool Al-Samman: Al-Manchifat).
 (Dool Al-Samman: Al-Dahl Al-Akhdar).
 (When will the ice return to Arabia?)
 (Mission of the American Geological Society of the Arctic Continent).
 (The prince of the Nabat poets, Muhammad bin Laboun: his biography and a study of his poetry).
 (History of Ibn Laboun).
 (Najdi historians and their effects).

He also participated in editing a number of encyclopedic works, including:

 (Atlas of satellite images of the Kingdom of Saudi Arabia). And it was issued by the Sultan bin Abdulaziz Al Saud Charitable Foundation.
 (Atlas of Saudi Arabia).
 (Encyclopedia of the Kingdom of Saudi Arabia).
 (Environmental Atlas of the Kingdom of Saudi Arabia).

References 

Saudi Arabian historians
Saudi Arabian geologists
Living people
Year of birth missing (living people)
Place of birth missing (living people)
Saudi Arabian writers
King Abdulaziz University alumni
King Saud University alumni